Akasaka Station is the name of several train stations in Japan:

 Akasaka Station (Tokyo) (赤坂駅) in Minato, Tokyo
 Akasaka Station (Gunma) (赤坂駅) in Maebashi, Gunma Prefecture
 Akasaka Station (Yamanashi) (赤坂駅) in Tsuru, Yamanashi Prefecture
 Akasaka Station (Fukuoka) (赤坂駅) in Chūō-ku, Fukuoka, Fukuoka Prefecture

It may also refer to:
 Mino-Akasaka Station (美濃赤坂駅) in Ōgaki, Gifu Prefecture
 Bingo-Akasaka Station (備後赤坂駅) in Fukuyama, Hiroshima Prefecture
 Meiden-Akasaka Station (名電赤坂駅) in Toyokawa, Aichi Prefecture
 Akasaka-mitsuke Station (赤坂見附駅) in Minato, Tokyo